1992 Deluxe is the second studio album by Princess Nokia. It was released on September 8, 2017. It is an expanded version of her 2016 mixtape, 1992. The title derives from her birth year. It peaked at number 25 on Billboards Heatseekers Albums chart.

Critical reception

At Metacritic, which assigns a weighted average score out of 100 to reviews from mainstream critics, 1992 Deluxe received an average score of 77% based on 8 reviews, indicating "generally favorable reviews".

Ben Beaumont-Thomas of The Guardian gave the album 4 stars out of 5, saying, "Her flow has the freewheeling energy of the battle freestyle, and often forgoes narrative in favour of a stream of boastful non-sequiturs about Mortal Kombat and Blue's Clues, but, through sheer force of charisma, her blunt edges still cause major damage." Writing for Noisey, Robert Christgau gave the album a grade of "A", calling her "the most complete New Yorker to hit hip-hop since Heems if not Nas."

NME listed it as the 32nd best album of 2017.

Track listing

Notes
  signifies a co-producer.

Charts

References

External links
 

2017 debut albums
Rough Trade Records albums
Princess Nokia albums